Tarīnkōṭ, also spelled as Tarin Kowt, is the capital of Uruzgan Province in southern Afghanistan in the Tarinkot District. Tarinkot city has a population of 71,604 (2015), with some 200 small shops in the city's bazaar.

In Tarinkot district, two major Pashtun tribal confederations are represented, Tareen tribes: Popolzai, Barakzai, Nurzai, Achakzai; and the Ghilzai tribes: Tokhi, Hotak. There are no medium or large-scale economic enterprises in the city.

Tarinkot is a Provincial Centre in south central Afghanistan. The majority of land is classified as non built-up (69%) of which agriculture is 67%. Residential land accounts for 47% of built-up land. The airport is located within the municipal boundaries, accounting the second largest built-up land use (24%).

On 13 August 2021, Tarinkot was captured by Taliban fighters as part of the wider 2021 Taliban offensive.

History
Historically, this locale remained a seat of some of the Tarin (or Tareen) Pashtun tribal sardars, as early as the 12th-13th centuries AD and some of them later migrated to the Indian subcontinent during or after the Mughal-Safavid War (1622-23).

Recent war
This town in southern Afghanistan was of significant strategic value to the Taliban in 2001. On November 16, the citizens here rose up against their Taliban governor, which marked the first organized Pashtun resistance against the Taliban. Hamid Karzai, then an obscure statesman, was in the region at the time trying to build an insurgency/army while accompanied by an 11-man U.S. Special Forces team, known as Operational Detachment Alpha 574. The Taliban launched a counterattack, confronting Karzai and his militia who dug in to defend the town. With the help of U.S. air power, the U.S. and militia force drove the Taliban back from Tarinkot.

The defeat of the Taliban at Tarinkot was an important victory for Karzai, who used the victory to recruit more men to his fledgling guerrilla band. His force would grow in size to a peak of around 800 men. On November 30, they left Tarinkot and began advancing on Kandahar.

An American base called FOB Ripley, named after U.S. Marine John Ripley was built in Tarinkot in 2004.
It was established by a Joint Task Force made up mainly of the 22nd Marine Expeditionary Unit (Special Operations Capable) (22ndMEU SOC), 2-5 Infantry (bobcats)/3rd BDE/ 25th Infantry Division, US Army Civil Affairs, and the Florida and Iowa National Guard Task Force 168 in May 2004.  In autumn 2001, the region was the last stronghold of Taliban regime.
Subsequently, other foreign military forces have operated at the base outside Tarinkot.

After the 22nd MEU SOC led Operation Mountain Storm, most of the Taliban forces moved to the mountainous region between Afghanistan and Pakistan. As NATO's ISAF mission assumed responsibility for security in Afghanistan's south, Dutch NATO troops built Kamp Holland (now Multi National Base Tarin Kot) in August 2006.

Beginning in March 2007, the United States Army Corps of Engineers (USACE) began construction of a road from Tarinkot westward to Deh Rahwod and then to Shahidi Hassas District, in the western areas of Oruzgan province. At the same time, the USACE also started paving and bridge construction to improve the road to Kandahar.

On 4 July 2010, U.S. soldiers from 1st Squadron, 2nd Stryker Cavalry Regiment assumed responsibility over operations in Tarinkot and Deh Rahwod in the wake of the Dutch withdrawal from Oruzgan.

On 27 July 2011, a Pakistani suicide terrorist from the Waziristan region of Pakistan was captured by the Afghan National Army and ISAF forces during a raid on the house of Mullah Qasim in the Sur Marghab area near Tirinkot. The would-be bomber named Saifullah was interviewed by Pajhwok Afghan News reporter Ahmad Omaid Khpalwak. In the interview Saifullah said he and 14 other terrorists from Pakistan spent at least two months wandering around the city to select a proper time and place for an attack. "Many times we encountered foreigners, but Mullah Qasim would escape after seeing foreigners and finally we were arrested without carrying out any attack," he said.

The next day, at around 12 pm, 28 July, three suicide attackers blew up vehicles packed with explosives at the gates of government compounds while other suicide bombers equipped with heavy weapons entered the buildings and began killing everyone inside. After the shooting ended at least 19 people were killed and 37 others wounded. The dead included Pajhwok reporter Khpalwak, 10 children, 2 women and 1 member of the Afghan National Police. Khpalwak was shot 20 times in different parts of his body. By 29 July the number of dead were raised to 21. Major General Angus Campbell, commander of Australian troops deployed to the region, said "Hard-line elements of the insurgency continue to pursue their campaign through violence and attempted targeted killings. Yesterday they paid a heavy price for their ambitions with all insurgents killed while failing to achieve their mission." Afghan National Army spokesman Hekmatullah Kuchi said "There were two blasts at the deputy governor's office. One was detonated by a suicide bomber and the other was caused by an ANA (Afghan army) soldier shooting another suicide attacker."

On March 1, 2011, U.S. soldiers from 4th Battalion, 70th Armor Regiment assumed responsibility of Tarinkot and Deh Rawod. On November 23, 2011, U.S. soldiers from the 1st Reconnaissance, Surveillance and Target Acquisition Squadron, 14th Cavalry Regiment assumed responsibility over operations in Tarinkot.

Transportation
As of May 2014 Tarinkot Airport had regularly scheduled direct passenger service to Kabul.

Geography
Tarinkot is somewhat isolated: its only airstrip is on the military base of the NATO-led ISAF Provincial Reconstruction Team on the outskirts of the town. Tarinkot's only ground access to the outside is a road to the regional center of Kandahar to the south, which can be subject to Taliban attacks sometimes and washouts.

Climate
Tarinkot has a cold semi-arid climate (Köppen climate classification BSk) with hot summers and cool to cold winters. Precipitation is low, and mostly falls from December to March.

See also
List of cities in Afghanistan
Orūzgān Province

References

External links

 (http://www.onlythingworthdyingfor.com)
 Australian Reconstruction Task Force 3
 FOB Martello, Nautilus Institute for Security and Sustainability at RMIT University.
 FOB Martello Construction, June, 2006, Canadian Army news.

Populated places in Urozgan Province
Urozgan Province
Provincial capitals in Afghanistan